Security Forces Headquarters – East (SFHQ-E) is a regional command of the Sri Lanka Army, responsible for the operational deployment and command of all army units stationed in and around the country's Eastern Province. The command was established on 31 October 2003 with 2 divisions, and currently consists of the 22 Division, 23 Division and 24 Division, a total of 8 brigades. The current Commander, SFHQ-E is Maj. Gen. Santhusitha Pananwala, in office since 2 November 2017.

Like the other area commands of the Sri Lanka Army, it coordinates operations and deployments of ground units of the Navy, Air Force and Police with that of the army in the area.

Composition
 22 Division, based in Trincomalee
 23 Division, based in Poonani, Batticaloa District
 24 Division, based in Malwatte

Past Commanders

References

Commands of the Sri Lanka Army